Manuel Antonio Barinaga (died 1897) was a 19th-century Peruvian lawyer and politician. He was born in Lima, Peru. He served as minister of finance and economy (1878 and 1879–1881), and justice in the Government of Peru. He served twice as Prime Minister of Peru (August 1883 – April 1884, November 1895 – August 1896).

References

Bibliography
 Basadre Grohmann, Jorge: Historia de la República del Perú. 1822 - 1933, Octava Edición, corregida y aumentada. Tomos 7, 8 y 9. Editada por el Diario "La República" de Lima y la Universidad "Ricardo Palma". Impreso en Santiago de Chile, 1998.
 Vargas Ugarte, Rubén: Historia General del Perú, Tomo X. La República (1879-1884). Lima, Editorial Milla Batres, 1984. Segunda Edición.

1897 deaths
People from Lima
19th-century Peruvian lawyers
Peruvian Ministers of Economy and Finance
Peruvian Ministers of Justice